Menuka Pradhan is a Nepalese film actress.

Filmography

Awards

References

External links 

 

21st-century Nepalese actresses
Living people
Nepalese female models
Nepalese film actresses
Actresses in Nepali cinema
Nepali film award winners
People from Nawalpur District
Year of birth missing (living people)